Edwin Charles Marsh (2 July 1899 – 2 May 1968) was an Australian rules footballer who played with South Melbourne in the Victorian Football League (VFL).

Notes

External links 

1899 births
1968 deaths
Australian rules footballers from Melbourne
Sydney Swans players
People from Scoresby, Victoria